Dao Vallis is a valley on Mars that appears to have been carved by water. It runs southwestward into Hellas Planitia from the southern slopes of the volcano Hadriacus Mons, and has been identified as an outflow channel.

It is named after the Thai word for star, and it was proposed as a potential landing site for the 2012 Curiosity rover of the Mars Science Laboratory mission. In the fictional 2007 Canadian miniseries Race to Mars, it is the landing site for Gagarin, the lander.

Origin 
Dao Vallis begins near a large volcano, Hadriacus Mons, so it is thought to have received water when hot magma melted huge amounts of ice in the frozen ground. Much of this water may have been released in very large "outburst floods". The partially circular depressions on the left side of the channel in the image below suggests that groundwater sapping also contributed water more gradually.

See also
Harmakhis Vallis
Outflow channels
Reull Vallis

References

External links
 Google Mars map centred on Dao Vallis.

Valleys and canyons on Mars
Hellas quadrangle